Hostert is a small town in the commune of Rambrouch, in western Luxembourg.  , the town has a population of 341.

Towns in Luxembourg
Rambrouch